Deepak Bista (born 2 July 1976) is a male Nepalese taekwondo former player and practitioner. One of the most popular and highly popular sportsperson in Nepal, he competed at the 2008 Summer Olympics. On August 8, 2008 at the opening ceremony of the Beijing Olympics, Bista was the flagbearer for Nepal. 

Bista is the first Nepalese male athlete Qualification to be selected for the 2008 Summer Olympics 
He won consecutive 2 bronze medals in the Asian Games and historical gold medals 4 times in a row in the South Asian Games 

Bista holds the record for highest number of gold medals, tied with Gaurika Singh, in South Asian Games.

References

Deepak Bista's profile at NBC Olympics

External links
 
 
 
 from a farm–boy to a trendsetter-My Republica

1976 births
Living people
Taekwondo practitioners at the 2008 Summer Olympics
Nepalese male taekwondo practitioners
Olympic taekwondo practitioners of Nepal
Asian Games medalists in taekwondo
Taekwondo practitioners at the 2002 Asian Games
Taekwondo practitioners at the 2006 Asian Games
Asian Games bronze medalists for Nepal
Medalists at the 2002 Asian Games
Medalists at the 2006 Asian Games
South Asian Games gold medalists for Nepal